Kpehi Jean Charles Didier Brossou (born 23 December 1989), simply known as Didier Brossou, is an Ivorian professional footballer who plays for Sheikh Russel KC as a midfielder. He joined the Bangladesh Premier League side in April 2022. His favorite player is former Manchester City midfielder Yaya Toure.

Honours
ASEC Mimosas

Ligue 1: 2010

Hapoel Ironi Kiryat Shmona

Toto Cup Al: runner-up 2016–17

References 

1989 births
Living people
Ivorian expatriate footballers
Expatriate footballers in Israel
ASEC Mimosas players
Hapoel Ramat Gan F.C. players
Hapoel Ironi Kiryat Shmona F.C. players
Maccabi Petah Tikva F.C. players
Ivorian footballers
Association football midfielders
Abahani Limited (Chittagong) players